Peer Productions is a youth arts charity based in Woking, England. 

Founded in August 2006, the charity specialises in peer education through theatre, and runs a free full-time one year training course for young actors aged 17–23 years, tours plays to schools and colleges and a runs a range of community projects reaching around 15,000 children around South East England.

Peer Productions runs the Generation Girls programme for Autistic Girls and girls with learning disabilities and online teen mental health drama 50 Days: Alone Together

References

External links 
 
Generation Girls - www.generationgirlsuk.com
50 Days: Alone Together - www.50daysalonetogether.com

2006 establishments in the United Kingdom
Charities based in Surrey
Peer learning
Performing arts education in the United Kingdom